Medea is the second album of the Dutch symphonic/progressive metal band Ex Libris, released in 2014. It is a concept album about the Greek tragedy of Medea and her lover Jason.

Track listing

Personnel 
Band members
Paul van den Broek - guitars (lead)
Koen Stam - keyboards
Dianne van Giersbergen - vocals
Peter den Bakker - bass guitar
Eelco van der Meer - drums
Guest/session members
Damian Wilson - vocals (on track 5)

References 

2014 albums
Ex Libris (band) albums
Cultural depictions of Jason
Works about Medea